Hotel Greenfield is a boutique hotel located in Greenfield, Iowa, United States.  Designed by architect William Gordon, it was completed in 1920 by the Newton Construction Co.  Local boosters had the hotel built for $65,000 as a replacement for the Commercial Hotel, which was located on the same spot.  The three-story brick structure features a symmetrical facade, round arched windows on the first floor, a projecting classical entrance with columns in the Doric order, and a denticulated brick cornice.  The hotel had become dated by the 1970s, and started to decline in significance.  ADCO Enterprises bought it in 2010 and renovated it.  They added the adjacent Adair County Democrat-Adair County Free Press Building at the same time.  It houses the restaurant, lounge, two hotel suites, and the laundry and housekeeping facilities.  The building was individually listed on the National Register of Historic Places in 2011.  In 2014 it was included as a contributing property in the Greenfield Public Square Historic District.

References

External links
Hotel Greenfield

Hotel buildings completed in 1920
Neoclassical architecture in Iowa
Greenfield, Iowa
Hotels in Iowa
Buildings and structures in Adair County, Iowa
National Register of Historic Places in Adair County, Iowa
Hotel buildings on the National Register of Historic Places in Iowa
Individually listed contributing properties to historic districts on the National Register in Iowa